Alvin Ottman Hofstad (March 29, 1905 – November 14, 1962) was an American farmer and politician.

Hofstad was born in Madison, Lac qui Parle County, Minnesota, and was a farmer. He lived in Madison, Minnesota with his wife and family. Hofstad served on the Madison School Board. He also served in the Minnesota House of Representatives from 1951 to his death in 1962. He died while still in office.

References

1905 births
1962 deaths
People from Madison, Minnesota
Farmers from Minnesota
School board members in Minnesota
Members of the Minnesota House of Representatives